Bhanu Pania (born 4 September 1996) is an Indian cricketer. He made his Twenty20 debut on 10 January 2021, for Baroda in the 2020–21 Syed Mushtaq Ali Trophy. He made his List A debut on 9 December 2021, for Baroda in the 2021–22 Vijay Hazare Trophy.

References

External links
 

1996 births
Living people
Indian cricketers
Baroda cricketers
Place of birth missing (living people)